Gustavo Bordet (born February 21, 1962) is an Argentine politician, the governor of Entre Ríos Province. He has previously served as mayor of Concordia, Entre Ríos.

Bordet was born in Concordia, Entre Ríos in 1962. He worked as a legislator of the city council. Governor Jorge Busti appointed him minister of health of the province in 2005, when Graciela López de Degani resigned because of a scandal. He was elected mayor of Concordia in 2007, and reelected in 2011. He was elected governor of Entre Ríos in 2015. His vice minister, Adán Bahl, was minister of the outgoing governor Sergio Urribarri.

Busti and Bordet are divided on the approach to the 2017 legislative elections. Busti had left the PJ and supports the Renewal Front. Bordet intends him to return to the PJ, considering that if Peronism does not unite under a single party it may be defeated by the Cambiemos political coalition. Although from a different political party, Bordet in good terms with president Mauricio Macri.

References

External links

Official site 

Governors of Entre Ríos Province
Justicialist Party politicians
Living people
People from Entre Ríos Province
1962 births
National University of Entre Ríos alumni
21st-century Argentine politicians